The Colorado Department of Human Services (CDHS) is the principal department of the Colorado state government that operates the state's social services. It has its headquarters in Denver.

Divisions
 Colorado Division of Youth Services

References

External links

 Official website

State agencies of Colorado